Xylota satyrus is a species of hoverfly in the family Syrphidae.

Distribution
Madagascar.

References

Eristalinae
Insects described in 1971
Diptera of Africa